Robin White is a former professional tennis player from the United States.

White played on the WTA Tour from 1983 to 1995. She won two singles titles: in Hershey, Pennsylvania, in 1985 and in Auckland in 1992. The highlight of her career was her victory with Gigi Fernández in the US Open women's doubles in 1988. She won 11 other doubles titles, including the US Open mixed doubles in 1989 with Shelby Cannon. She was a finalist in the Australian Open mixed doubles in 1991 and reached the final of the women's doubles in 1994 with Katerina Maleeva.

White's singles record includes wins over Pam Shriver, Hana Mandlíková and Gabriela Sabatini. Her highest rankings were world No. 15 for singles and No. 8 for doubles. She currently is a full-time national coach for women's tennis for the USTA.

Grand Slam finals

Doubles: 2 (1 title, 1 runner-up)

Mixed doubles: 2 (1 title, 1 runner-up)

References

External links
 
 

Living people
American female tennis players
US Open (tennis) champions
Grand Slam (tennis) champions in women's doubles
Grand Slam (tennis) champions in mixed doubles
Tennis people from California
21st-century American women
Year of birth missing (living people)